IDPH may refer to:
 Illinois Department of Public Health
 Iowa Department of Public Health